Dunki may refer to:

 Dunki (or donkey flight), Punjabi term for illegal entry and illegal immigration, referring to donkey-like long walks by immigrants
 Dunki (film), 2023 Indian film based on the issue by Rajkumar Hirani
 Dangi-ye Akbarabad, a village in Iran
 Dunki, Peren, a village in Nagaland, India